The 2010–11 Czech Cup was the eighteenth season of the annual football knock-out tournament of the Czech Republic. It began on 18 July 2010 with the preliminary round and concluded with the final on 25 May 2011.

Teams

Preliminary round
The Preliminary round took place on 18 July 2010.

|}

First round
The First round was played on 23, 24 and 25 July 2010. The match between FC Přední Kopanina and FC Chomutov was postponed and played on 31 July 2010.

|}

Second round
The main date for second round matches was 1 September 2010.

|}
Notes

Third round
The Third round was played on 22 September 2010.

|}

Fourth round
The first legs of the fourth round were played on 27 October 2010, and the second legs were played on 10 November 2010.

|}

Quarter finals
The first legs of the quarter-finals were played on 13 and 14 April 2011, and the second legs were played on 20 April 2011.

|}

First legs

Second legs

Semi finals
The first legs of the semi-finals were played on 3 and 5 May 2011, and the second legs were played on 10 and 11 May 2011.

|}

1The first leg between Slavia Prague and Sigma Olomouc was suspended after the first half at a score of 1–1 after Slavia supporters invaded the pitch. Sigma were awarded a 3–0 win.

Final

See also
 2010–11 Czech First League
 2010–11 Czech 2. Liga

References

External links
 Official site 
 soccerway.com

2010–11
2010–11 domestic association football cups
Cup